Serdar Nazif Nasır is a Turkish plastic surgeon. An associate professor at the Hacettepe University Medical School in Ankara, he led the team that performed in February 2012 the second full face transplant in Turkey.

Education
Nasır finished the high school 1989 in Yenimahalle, Ankara. He completed his medical education at the Medicine Faculty of Ankara University in 1996. Between 1996-2002, he conducted his specialty education in the Department of Plastic, Reconstructive and Aesthetic Surgery of Hacettepe University Faculty of Medicine.

After working seven years at Süleyman Demirel University in Isparta, Serdar Nasır returned to Hacettepe University in 2009.

He carried out further studies between 2006-2008 on composite tissue transplants at Cleveland Clinic in Ohio, USA.

Serdar Nasır is specialized in the fields of breast reconstruction, hand surgery, repair of tissue deficiencies, restoration of facial muscles in paralysis of facial nerves, and face and body esthetics.

Achievements
On February 24, 2012, Serdar Nasır and his team successfully performed two important transplants simultaneously at the Hacettepe University Hospital, a full face transplant and a multiple limb transplant. While the full face transplant was the second one in Turkey following the country's first-ever one after almost one month, the two-arm and two-leg transplant was the first trial in the world.

The face of 25-year-old Cengiz Gül was badly burnt in a television tube implosion accident when he was two-years of age. The donor was 40-year-old N. A. (his family did not allow revealing of his identity), who was declared brain dead two days before the surgery following a motorcycle accident occurred on February 17.

The second transplant was simultaneously carried out in another operating room on Şevket Çavdar (25), who lost his two arms and two legs in a natural gas explosion caused by short circuit as he was carrying out installation in 1998. The organs were taken from the same donor at Dokuz Eylül University's hospital in İzmir by Prof. Gökhan Tunçbilek, and were brought to Ankara on board an aircraft belonging to the Ministry of Health.

Şevket Çavdar died on February 27, 2012, while he was being treated in the intensive care station, after his transplanted two arms and two legs were amputated the day before due to immune dysregulation. This case was accepted as first quadruple extremity transplantation in the world.

Awards
Serdar Nasır is the winner of second prizes in national competitions of experimental and clinical specialty for plastic surgery.

References

Living people
Turkish plastic surgeons
Ankara University alumni
Hacettepe University alumni
Academic staff of Süleyman Demirel University
Academic staff of Hacettepe University
Year of birth missing (living people)
Place of birth missing (living people)